US Government Documents is a digital collection of documents at the Internet Archive. This collection contains digital versions of over 50,000 United States Government documents. The contributors of this collection are Kahle/Austin Foundation, MSN and Omidyar Network.

Sub-collections

9th Circuit of the United States Court of Appeals
This collection contains briefs of the 9th Circuit of the United States Court of Appeals beginning in 1892 and continuing until the present. These briefs are contained in the collection of the University of California Hastings College of the Law Library and are being scanned as part of the Law.gov effort. The number of items in this collection is over 3,000 items.

Administrative Conference of the United States
This collection is related to the Administrative Conference of the United States and contains over 100 items.

California Government Documents
This collection contains about 50 items.

George Washington Carver and Tuskegee Weather Data
The documents of this collection from the NOAA Central library are voluntary meteorological observations taken at the Tuskegee Institute in, Tuskegee from November 1899 through June 1954. This collection contains over 600 items.

Global Public Safety Codes
This collection contains global Edicts of Government, such as building, fire, electrical, and plumbing codes. The documents contain the legislative or executive declaration and the model codes that are thereby incorporated by reference.
The collection is maintained by Public.Resource.Org. This collection contains over 28,000 items.

The VENONA Files
This collection contains over 3,000 items.

United States Patents and Trademarks
This is a collection of patents and trademarks from the United States Patent and Trademark Office.

References

External links
 

Internet Archive collections